FATUS (Foreign Agricultural Trade System of the United States) is a system of more than 200 trade codes created and maintained by USDA’s Economic Research Service to summarize U.S. agricultural trade in a form accessible to the public. FATUS codes aggregate more than 4,000 import and 2,000 export, 10-digit agricultural trade codes from the Harmonized Tariff Schedule of the U.S. (HTS), under which all U.S. trade data are originally collected by the Census Bureau of the U.S. Department of Commerce. FATUS groupings are similar to, but tend to be more detailed than, those provided to the public through the BICO data system maintained by USDA’s Foreign Agricultural Service.

See also

BICO
U.S. Trade Internet System.

United States Department of Agriculture